Stokowski (feminine: Stokowska, plural: Stokowscy) is a Polish-language surname. Notable people with the surname include: 

 Anne K. Stokowski (1925–2020), American politician
 Eugene E. Stokowski (1921–1979), American politician
 Ferdynand Stokowski (1776–1827), Polish officer
 Leopold Stokowski (1882–1977), British-born American orchestral conductor
 Olga Samaroff Stokowski (1880–1948), American pianist, music critic, and teacher
 Margarete Stokowski (born 1986), German-Polish feminist writer

Polish-language surnames